The Battle of Kosmidion occurred on 15 June 1410, during the Ottoman Interregnum, and was fought between the forces of the rival brothers, Musa Çelebi and Süleyman Çelebi, at Kosmidion (modern Eyüp) just outside the land walls of Constantinople.

Battle
The Byzantine emperor Manuel II Palaiologos was allied with Süleyman, whose army was encamped inside Constantinople. Manuel also prepared ships to help evacuate Süleyman's army in case of a defeat, but Musa managed to set them on fire before the battle began.

The battle was a victory for Süleyman Çelebi, chiefly due to the defection of many of his vassals, who had previously served Süleyman, defected. Among the defectors was Vuk Lazarević, the brothers' half-uncle. Laonikos Chalkokondyles claims that Vuk's brother Stefan also defected due to the pressure of Süleyman's ally, the Byzantine emperor Manuel II Palaiologos, but the chronicler Constantine of Kostenets reports that he fought alongside Musa in the battle, only to seek refuge with Palaiologos after the battle was lost. The battle initially went well for Musa, with Süleyman's army suffering heavy losses, until Süleyman with a few hundred men attacked Musa's camp. Both sides suffered heavy losses in the fighting.

Aftermath
After the battle, Musa retreated to the area around Yambol and Chernomen in Bulgaria, while Süleyman recaptured the Ottoman capital of Edirne. One of his lieutenants, Aliaz, was able to capture Vuk Lazarević at Plovdiv. Musa had Vuk executed for his betrayal.

References

Sources
 

1410 in Europe
1410 in the Ottoman Empire
Conflicts in 1410
Kosmidion
Battles involving Serbia in the Middle Ages
Battles involving the Byzantine Empire
Eyüp